Joey Brezinski (born September 5, 1979) is an American street skateboarder. He originates from Orange County, United States (US) listed as his "hometown".

Professional skateboarding
The "backside tail-slide" is Brezinski's favored trick and he is well known for his "manual" tricks.

Sponsors
As of December 2011, Brezinski is sponsored by Cliché Skateboards, Autobahn, Diamond, Andale Bearings, Val Surf, Red Bull, Skatepark of Tampa Party Team, Siege Audio, So Rad Clothing, Tensor, Grizzly Grip, Evol Burritos, FP Insoles, AWE Tuning, and lifestyle accessories brand, AWSM.

Contest history
Brezinski won his fourth Manny Mania contest, hosted by Red Bull in New York City, in August 2012.

Company owner
Brezinski has collaborated with fellow professional skateboarder, Paul Rodriguez, to form the bearing company, Andale. Brezinski has revealed that the name initially emerged following a conversation between Brezinski and another professional skateboarder, Chico Brenes, and the brand concept was then initiated during a period when both Brezinski and Rodriguez were between bearing sponsors.

Inspiration
Brezinski has stated that his favorite skateboarding video is Transworld Skateboarding's Modus Operandi.

References

1981 births
Living people
American skateboarders